Commonwealth Park is in Canberra, Australia, adjacent to the north side of Lake Burley Griffin. Centrally located in the city, it is an important part of the urban landscape. The park has an area of 34.25 hectares, which includes a variety of natural and constructed spaces.

Various designers have been involved in the construction of the park including Charles Weston, Lindsay Pryor, Richard Clough and John Grey. The park in it current form was strongly influenced by a master plan created by British landscape designer, Dame Sylvia Crowe in 1964.

The park has many small ponds and water features, walking trails, bike paths, sculptures and memorials. Located within the park is the outdoor Stage 88, which often holds concerts. The park includes Regatta Point and has a view of the National Gallery, High Court, and National Library on the other side of the lake. Kings Park is located adjacent to Commonwealth Park, along the lake to the east.

Commonwealth Park is the home of many events hosted in Canberra. Among them is Floriade, an annual event that has been running since 1988.

History of the location 
In 1874, Ebenezer Booth built himself a house on the glebe of St John the Baptist Church, within the present boundaries of the park, to the east of what is now Nerang Pool.  Murray's store, considered the area's first retail store, operated from the house.  It burnt down in 1923.  A number of stunted pines and English elms remain on the spot.

In his original plan for the city, Walter Griffin included a recreation area to the north of the man-made lake.  His final plan of 1918 included an "aquarium pond", now Nerang Pool.  Modifications from Griffin's plan of 1911 came about following his actual visit to the site and in order to reduce the amount of earthworks needed.  The recreation area in the earlier plan was more formal and included many public buildings.

Works of Art in the Park

Memorials in the Park

References

Further reading

External links 

Australian Heritage Database listing for the Lake Burley Griffin Conservation Area
National Library of Australia: picture of Sylvia Crowe and Richard Clough viewing the construction of Nerang Pool, Commonwealth Gardens in 1977
Australian Institute of Landscape Architects: Obituary Dame Sylvia Crowe (1901-1997)
Australian Institute of Landscape Architects: Award for Floriade in Commonwealth Park
Sylvia Crowe - Influence and Work in Australia by Richard Clough and Margaret Hendry

Parks in Canberra